Lake Meredith National Recreation Area is a United States national recreation area located about  north of Amarillo, Texas, in the Texas Panhandle. Its main attraction is  Lake Meredith, a reservoir created by Sanford Dam on the Canadian River.

Activities at Lake Meredith include boating, fishing, swimming, camping, hiking, and hunting. Five boat launch ramps remain open, and one marina previously provided access to the lake, however the marina closed during the drought of 2011–2013. Park headquarters are in Fritch.

Visitors to Lake Meredith peaked at over 1.94 million in 1984, but with record-low water levels, visitation fell from 1.08 million in 2009 to 502,457 in 2012.

Alibates Flint Quarries National Monument is located adjacent to Lake Meredith National Recreation Area.

Gallery

References

External links
 National Park Service: Lake Meredith National Recreation Area

Protected areas of Hutchinson County, Texas
Protected areas of Moore County, Texas
National Park Service National Recreation Areas
Protected areas of Potter County, Texas
National Park Service areas in Texas
Protected areas established in 1990
1990 establishments in Texas